The Prism Prize is a national juried award recognizing the artistry of the modern music video in Canada. A jury of over 120 Canadian music and film industry professionals, including members of the print and web media, broadcasting, film, radio, and video art communities, nominate the 10 best videos of the year to comprise the Prism Prize shortlist. The winning video receives a cash prize of $15,000. This is the richest cash prize for music videos in North America.

Founded in 2012, the award is administered by the Academy of Canadian Cinema and Television.

The inaugural Prism Prize was awarded in March 2013 to director Noah Pink for Rich Aucoin’s "Brian Wilson Is A.L.I.V.E", while director Vincent Morisset took home the Audience Award for Arcade Fire’s "Sprawl II".

For the second award presentation in 2014, the Prism Prize introduced two new awards, the Special Achievement Award for artistic achievements and exceptional contribution to music video art on a world stage, and the Arthur Lipsett Award for innovative and unique approaches to music video art.

The 2014 Prism Prize was presented on March 23, 2014 to director Emily Kai Bock for her Arcade Fire "Afterlife" video. The Audience Award went to director Kheaven Lewandowski for his video for "River" by The Belle Game. The Arthur Lipsett Award was presented to Scott Cudmore and Michael LeBlanc for their innovative video work. The Special Achievement Award went to Floria Sigismondi.

In 2020 the committee introduced the Willie Dunn Award, a lifetime achievement award honouring Canadians who have been trailblazers in the art of music video. The award was named in memory of Willie Dunn, an indigenous Canadian musician whose 1968 animated short film The Ballad of Crowfoot has sometimes been credited as the first Canadian music video.

Winners and nominees

2013
Nominees were announced on February 14, 2013, and the winners were announced on March 24.
 Prism Prize: Rich Aucoin, "Brian Wilson Is A.L.I.V.E." (director Noah Pink) 
 Audience Award: Arcade Fire - "Sprawl II (Mountains Beyond Mountains)" (director Vincent Morisset)Drake - "HYFR (Hell Ya Fucking Right)" (director Director X)
 Grimes - "Genesis" (director Claire Boucher)
Grimes - "Oblivion" (director Emily Kai Bock)
METZ - "Wet Blanket" (director Scott Cudmore)
Mother Mother - "The Sticks" (director Chad VanGaalen)
Maylee Todd - "Baby's Got It" (director Reynard Li)
Yamantaka // Sonic Titan - "Hoshi Neko" (directors Emily Pelstring and Ruby Kato Attwood)
Young Rival - "Two Reasons" (director John Smith)

2014
Nominees were announced on February 18, 2014, and the winners were announced on March 23.
 Prism Prize: Arcade Fire - "Afterlife" (director Emily Kai Bock) Audience Award: The Belle Game – "River" (director Kheaven Lewandowski)Arcade Fire – "Reflektor" (director Anton Corbijn)
Drake – "Started from the Bottom" (director Director X)
Hollerado – "So It Goes" (director Marc Ricciardelli)
Keys N Krates – "Dum Dee Dum" (director Amos LeBlanc)
Jessy Lanza – "Kathy Lee" (director Lee Skinner)
Majical Cloudz – "Childhood’s End" (director Emily Kai Bock)
Shad – "Fam Jam (Fe Sum Immigrins)" (director Che Kothari)
Young Galaxy – "New Summer" (director Ivan Grbovic)

2015
Nominees were announced on February 12, 2015, and the winners were announced on March 29.
 Prism Prize: Timber Timbre, "Beat the Drum Slowly" (director Chad VanGaalen) Audience Award: Kandle, "Not Up to Me" (director Natalie Rae Robison)The New Pornographers, "Dancehall Domine" (directors Scott Cudmore and Michael LeBlanc)
PUP, "Guilt Trip" (directors Chandler Levack and Jeremy Schaulin-Rioux)
Fur Trade, "Same Temptation" (director Kheaven Lewandowski)
Rich Aucoin, "Yelling in Sleep" (director Joel Mackenzie)
Ryan Hemsworth, "Snow in Newark" (director Martin C. Pariseau)
Kevin Drew, "You in Your Were" (director Samir Rehem)
Odonis Odonis, "Order in the Court" (director Lee Stringle)
Chad VanGaalen, "Monster" (director Chad VanGaalen)

2016
Beginning in 2016, the prize revised its process. A longlist of 20 nominees was announced on February 9, 2016, a shortlist of 10 finalists was announced on March 22, and the winner was named on May 15.

Shortlist
 Prism Prize: Kalle Mattson, "Avalanche" (director Philip Sportel) Audience Award: Death From Above 1979, "Virgins" (director Eva Michon)A Tribe Called Red, "Suplex" (director Jon Riera)
Braids, "Miniskirt" (director Kevan Funk)
Drake, "Hotline Bling" (director Director X)
The Elwins, "So Down Low" (director Alan Poon)
The Fast Romantics, "Julia" (director Matthew Angus)
Grimes, "Flesh Without Blood" (director Grimes)
Harrison, "How Can It Be" (director Maxime Lamontagne)
Monogrenade, "Le Fantôme" (director Kristof Brandl)

Longlist

2017
Winners
 Prism Prize: Kaytranada, "Lite Spots" (director Martin C. Pariseau) Audience Award: Andy Shauf, "The Magician" (director Winston Hacking)Lipsett Prize: Kid
Hi-Fidelity Award: July Talk
Special Achievement: Revolver Films

Shortlist

Longlist

2018
Winners
 Prism Prize: Charlotte Day Wilson, "Work" (director Fantavious Fritz) Audience Award: Daniel Caesar, "Freudian, A Visual" (directors Keavan Yazdani and Sean Brown)Hi-Fidelity Award: GrimesLipsett Award: Karena Evans, making her the first woman to win the award
Special Achievement Award: Cherie SinclairShortlist

Longlist

2019

Winners
 Prism Prize: The Belle Game, "Low" (director Kevan Funk) Audience Award: Said the Whale, "UnAmerican" (director Johnny Jansen)Hi-Fidelity Award: Clairmont the Second, "Gheeze" (director Clairmont the Second)Lipsett Award: Soleil DenaultSpecial Achievement Award: Lacey DukeShortlist

Longlist

2020
The longlist for the 2020 Prism Prize was announced in February 2020, with the shortlist originally slated to be announced on April 2 and the winner to be announced on May 11. Due to the COVID-19 pandemic in Canada, however, the prize committee cancelled the May 11 event, and postponed the announcement of the winners to July 22 for the special awards, and July 23 for the topline categories. In addition, they opted not to issue a shortlist, instead announcing that all 20 longlisted nominees would be eligible for the final awards.

Winners
 Prism Prize: Jessie Reyez, "Far Away" (director Peter Huang) Audience Award: Daniel Caesar ft. Koffee, "CYANIDE REMIX" (directors Keavan Yazdani, Sean Brown)Hi-Fidelity Award: Daniela AndradeLipsett Award: TranquiloWillie Dunn Award: Laurieann GibsonSpecial Achievement Award: Bardia ZeinaliLonglist

2021
The longlisted nominees for the 2021 Prism Prize were announced on April 29, 2021, with the shortlist announced on June 9 and the winners announced on July 26.

Winners
 Prism Prize: Haviah Mighty, "Thirteen" (director Theo Kapodistrias) Audience Award: Aquakultre, "Pay It Forward" (directors Evan Elliot and Lance Sampson)Hi-Fidelity Award: Crack Cloud
Lipsett Award: Gennelle Cruz
Willie Dunn Award: Leanne Betasamosake Simpson
Special Achievement Award: Jordan Oram

Shortlist

Longlist

2022

Winners
 Prism Prize: Mustafa, "Ali" Audience Award: Khanvict, "Closer" (director Anjali Nayar)
Hi-Fidelity Award: Chiiild
Lipsett Award: Iris Kim
Willie Dunn Award: Mustafa
Special Achievement Award: Sammy Rawal

Shortlist

References

External links

Canadian music video awards
Awards established in 2012
2012 establishments in Canada
Academy of Canadian Cinema & Television